The Kunar snowtrout (Schizothorax labiatus) is a species of ray-finned fish in the genus Schizothorax which is found in India, Nepal, Pakistan, Afghanistan and Tibet.

References 

Schizothorax
Fish described in 1842